New Home Independent School District is a public school district based in New Home, Texas (USA).

The district has one school that serves students in grades kindergarten through twelve.

History
By 2018 the district began to receive a population increase as the number of residents in the Lubbock metropolitan area grew.

Academic achievement
In 2009, the school district was rated "academically acceptable" by the Texas Education Agency.

Special programs

Athletics
Previously the town had a full eleven-man football roster, but switched to six-man football in 1982. New Home still qualified for Class 1A, the smallest bracket of the Texas public high school sports league University Interscholastic League (UIL), in February 2018, when it had 93 students. If a high school reached 104.9 students, it would be required to go to Class 2A and play full eleven-man football. In fall 2018 the district chose to revert to eleven-man football anyway due to a foreseen population increase. As of 2020, New Home is a member of Class 2A across all sports.

See also

List of school districts in Texas

References

External links
New Home ISD

School districts in Lynn County, Texas